Jersey has competed sixteen times in the Commonwealth Games to date, beginning in 1958.

History
Jersey first participated at the Games in 1958 in Cardiff, Wales.

Medal tally

Jersey was forty-fifth on the all-time medal tally of the Commonwealth Games after the 2014 games in Glasgow, Scotland, having won six medals since 1958, the last (including their only gold) in 1990, when Colin Mallett won the Open Full Bore Rifle competition.

External links
 Official website of the Jersey Commonwealth Games Association

References

 
Nations at the Commonwealth Games